Toc-H Public School is a public school in Kochi, Kerala, India.

The school is affiliated to the Central Board of Secondary Education (CBSE), New Delhi, for AISSE (Grade 10) and AISSCE (Grade 12) examinations.

Toc H Public School is located at Toc H Nagar, Vyttila, Kochi 682019

History
The Toc H Public School opened its doors in 1978.

The school is sponsored by the Toc H Society and administered by the Board of Directors. This Society is registered as a charitable Society under the Act of 1955. Toc H is an international Christian social service organization having its origins at Poperinge, in Belgium during the First World War.

The school began in 1978 with 32 students, on the 3rd floor of Kalabhavan near Ernakulam Town Hall. The school opened with only the first and fifth standards. During the second year, the second and sixth standard were added. In 1980, the school bought its own property (a reclaimed land) at Vytilla with a water frontage. The school is still located at this location, on Toc-H Road, Toc-H Nagar, Vytilla, Kochi - 682019

The first graduates of the 10th standard (seven students) were in 1984.

Toc H had its first batch of commerce students in 2004 with 18 students and its second batch in 2005 expanded with 30 students.
TocH started its humanities batch in 2019.

House system
The school has four houses which are:

Blue Diamond, Green Emerald, Red Ruby and Yellow Sapphire (formerly White Sapphire)

Notable alumni
 Dulquer Salmaan, Actor 
 Malavika Nair, Actress 
 Hibi Eden, politician

also
 Toc H
 Toc-H Institute of Science and Technology
 List of schools in Ernakulam
 Toc H Public School, Tripunithura

References

 Toc H Organisation
 Toc H Public School

External links
 Official website
 Toc-H Institute of Science and Technology

Private schools in Kochi
Educational institutions established in 1978